Rochester City Hall is a historic government building in Rochester in Monroe County, New York. Also known as the Federal Building and Old Post Office, the building was originally built for use by the federal government. It is a four-story, Richardsonian Romanesque style structure with an inner court and tower. It was built between 1885 and 1889 of heavy brown sandstone with a metal skeleton. It was expanded in 1893 and in 1907. The building was designed in part by architect Harvey Ellis under the Office of the Supervising Architect Mifflin E. Bell. The building has served as the City Hall since the 1970s. It was listed on the National Register of Historic Places in 1972.

Federal offices in Rochester, the Kenneth B. Keating Federal Building, and the United States Court House are located across the street at 100 State Street.

References

External links

Rochester City Hall photo tour

Federal buildings in the United States
Buildings and structures in Rochester, New York
City and town halls on the National Register of Historic Places in New York (state)
Government buildings on the National Register of Historic Places in New York (state)
Historic American Buildings Survey in New York (state)
Government buildings completed in 1885
Romanesque Revival architecture in New York (state)
National Register of Historic Places in Rochester, New York